The 1999 Central American and Caribbean Championships in Athletics were held at the Barbados National Stadium in Bridgetown, Barbados between 25–27 June.

Medal summary

Men's events

Women's events

Medal table

See also
1999 in athletics (track and field)

External links
Men Results – GBR Athletics
Women Results – GBR Athletics

Central American and Caribbean Championships in Athletics
Central American and Caribbean Championships
Sport in Bridgetown
20th century in Bridgetown
International athletics competitions hosted by Barbados
1999 in Barbadian sport